Associação Esportiva de Venâncio Aires, known as Assoeva, is a Brazilian sports club based in Venâncio Aires, that is best known for its futsal team. It was the runner-up of the 2017 edition of Liga Futsal.

Club honours

State competitions
 Campeonato Gaúcho de Futsal: 2017

Current squad

References

External links
 Assoeva official website
 Assoeva LNF profile
 Assoeva in zerozero.pt

Sports clubs established in 1982
Futsal clubs established in 1982
Futsal clubs in Brazil
Sports teams in Rio Grande do Sul
1982 establishments in Brazil